Jalal Faqira is a Yemeni politician. He quit his position as a central committee member over the 2011 Yemeni uprising. He is a political scientist at Sanaa University.

References

21st-century Yemeni politicians
Living people
Academic staff of Sanaa University
Year of birth missing (living people)
Place of birth missing (living people)